Edward Sharp House is located in Camden, Camden County, New Jersey, United States. The house was built in 1810 and was added to the National Register of Historic Places on February 29, 1980.

See also
National Register of Historic Places listings in Camden County, New Jersey

References

Houses on the National Register of Historic Places in New Jersey
Federal architecture in New Jersey
Houses completed in 1810
Houses in Camden County, New Jersey
Buildings and structures in Camden, New Jersey
National Register of Historic Places in Camden County, New Jersey
New Jersey Register of Historic Places